National Route 403 is a national highway of Japan connecting Chūō-ku, Niigata and Matsumoto, Nagano in Japan, with a total length of 352.8 km (219.22 mi).

References

National highways in Japan
Roads in Nagano Prefecture
Roads in Niigata Prefecture